"Don't Look Back" is a song by British pop-rock band Fine Young Cannibals. It was released as the third single from the band's 1988 album The Raw & the Cooked. The song reached the top 40 charts in the United Kingdom, United States, Canada, Australia, and New Zealand.

Music and lyrics
Written by lead vocalist Roland Gift and bassist David Steele, the lyrics of "Don't Look Back" are mostly pessimistic, and depict someone who tries desperately to leave their difficult past behind them without looking back. 
While the band's previous two hits, the US number ones "She Drives Me Crazy" and "Good Thing", were influenced by American rhythm and blues, "Don't Look Back" features guitar riffs that are more reminiscent of The Byrds and The Beatles.

Release and reception
Released in August 1989, "Don't Look Back" hit number 11 on the  Billboard Hot 100 Singles chart,  number eight on the Singles Sales chart, number 18 on the Hot 100 Airplay chart ,number nine on the Modern Rock chart and number 10 on the Cash Box Top 100 chart.
The song peaked at number 10 on the Canadian Singles Chart in October. 
It also reached number 34 in the UK, 
number 23 in New Zealand, and number 38 in Australia.

Track listing
7" vinyl (Europe, Australasia)
"Don't Look Back" - 3:43
"You Never Know" - 4:27

7" vinyl (US, Canada)
"Don't Look Back" - 3:36
"As Hard As It Is" - 3:10

12" vinyl, CD maxi-single
"Don't Look Back" (12" mix) - 5:50
"You Never Know" - 4:27
"Don't Look Back" (7" mix) - 3:43

Chart performance

Weekly charts

Year-end charts

References

1989 songs
1989 singles
Fine Young Cannibals songs
Songs written by David Steele (musician)
Songs written by Roland Gift
I.R.S. Records singles